Aldania yunnana is a  butterfly found in the  Palearctic where it is endemic to 
China that belongs to the browns family.

Description from Seitz

N. yunnana Oberth. (55a) is extremely similar to the previous forms, smaller, the position of the markings
as in Aldania thisbe, their colour bright yellow-ochre, the median band of the hindwing comparatively broad,
canary yellow beneath, as are also the spots of the forewing. Before the band of the hindwing a reddish brown area in which are situated several purplish spots; costal margin ochreous yellow at the base, the distal margin brownish, traversed by reddish brown curved lines. Tsekou.

References

Limenitidinae
Butterflies described in 1906